"Peanuts and Diamonds" is a song written by Bobby Braddock. It was first recorded by American country singer-songwriter Bill Anderson. It was released as a single in 1976 via MCA Records and became a major hit the same year.

Background and release
"Peanuts and Diamonds" was recorded on April 22, 1976 at Bradley's Barn, located in Mount Juliet, Tennessee. The session was produced by Buddy Killen, who recently became Anderson's producer after many years of working with Owen Bradley. Killen would continue producing Anderson until his departure from MCA Records. Three additional tracks were recorded at the same studio session, including his major hit "Liars One, Believers Zero.

"Peanuts and Diamonds" was released as a single by MCA Records in August 1976. The song spent 14 weeks on the Billboard Hot Country Singles before reaching number ten in October of that year. In Canada, the single reached number seven on the RPM Country Songs chart in 1975. It was released on his 1976 studio album, Peanuts and Diamonds and Other Jewels.

Track listings
7" vinyl single
 "Peanuts and Diamonds" – 3:10
 "Your Love Blows Me Away" – 3:03

Chart performance

References

1976 singles
1976 songs
Bill Anderson (singer) songs
MCA Records singles
Songs written by Bobby Braddock